Beauvilliers may refer to:

Beauvilliers (surname), a French surname, also of French nobility 
Communes in France:
Beauvilliers, Eure-et-Loir, in the Eure-et-Loir department
Beauvilliers, Loir-et-Cher, in the Loir-et-Cher department
Beauvilliers, Yonne, in the Yonne department